The Longest Ride may refer to:

 The Longest Ride (film), a 2015 American Neo Western romantic drama film based on Spark's novel of the same name
 The Longest Ride (novel), a 2013 novel by Nicholas Sparks